Christophe Calegari is a French rugby league footballer who represented Italy in the 2013 World Cup.

Playing career
In 2013 he was playing for Lézignan Sangliers in the Elite One Championship at centre.

In 2016 he joined fellow Elite One Championship club Palau XIII Broncos.

References

External links
2017 RLWC profile

1984 births
Living people
Baroudeurs de Pia XIII players
French people of Italian descent
French rugby league players
Italy national rugby league team players
Lézignan Sangliers players
Palau Broncos players
Rugby league centres
Rugby league wingers